Papuechites is a genus of flowering plants in the family Apocynaceae, first described as a genus in 1925. It contains only one known species, Papuechites aambe, native to New Guinea, the Bismarck Archipelago, and the Indonesian Province of Maluku.

formerly included
 Papuechites novoguineensis (K.Schum.) Markgr. = Micrechites novoguineensis K.Schum. 
 Papuechites warianus (Schltr.) Markgr. = Micrechites warianus (Schltr.) D.J.Middleton

References

Flora of Papuasia
Flora of the Maluku Islands
Monotypic Apocynaceae genera
Apocyneae